Loop 375 is a beltway that partially encircles the city of El Paso, Texas. The beltway is mostly a freeway, except for its northern section, which includes at-grade intersections. The highway passes through various areas of El Paso, funneling traffic within and around the city. The road is known locally under different names, as Woodrow Bean Transmountain Drive in the northern section, Purple Heart Memorial Freeway in the northeastern section, Joe Battle Boulevard in the eastern section, the César Chávez Border Highway in the southern section, and the Border West Expressway on the southwest section.

Route description

Woodrow Bean Transmountain Drive 
Loop 375 begins clockwise at an intersection with I-10 near Canutillo. Heading east, the highway enters and passes through the Franklin Mountains State Park and the Fort Bliss Castner Range before leaving at Northeast El Paso, where it meets US 54. The highway passes through Northeast El Paso before entering Fort Bliss.

The section through Franklin Mountains State Park includes many road cuts which expose outcrops of Precambrian rocks, which are some of the oldest in Texas.

Purple Heart Memorial Freeway 
After entering Fort Bliss, the highway bypasses Biggs Army Airfield to the north and east, and meets Spur 601 east of the airfield, before leaving at an intersection with US 62/US 180 in Southeast El Paso.

Joe Battle Boulevard 
After leaving Fort Bliss, the highway passes through Southeast El Paso, heading south through residential neighborhoods, before curving southwest to meet I-10 at a stack interchange. Continuing southwest, the highway passes through more neighborhoods before meeting the El Paso Ysleta Port of Entry.

César Chávez Border Highway 
After meeting the El Paso Ysleta Port of Entry, the highway curves northwest, following the Mexican border along the Rio Grande. Heading into downtown, the highway intersects US 54 at an interchange, passing unter the El Paso BOTA Port of Entry. The highway continues west into downtown, ending at US 62/US 85 Paisano Drive in downtown.

Border West Expressway
From downtown, the most recent part of Loop 375, the Border West Expressway, passes through the narrow gap between UTEP and the Mexican border, elevated above the railroad tracks between Interstate 10 and US Route 85 (the CanAm Highway). The project is intended as an alternate route to I-10 to relieve traffic congestion in and around downtown El Paso. Funding and construction of the project began in September 2007. The highway is proposed to be a four lane toll road. In March 2018, the original completion date estimate of late 2017 was pushed back to May 2019. The new expressway opened for traffic on October 3, 2019, without tolls initially although it is intended to be a toll road.

Originally described as a Loop 375 extension, the project was named as Border West Expressway in 2014.  On completion, signs show it as part of Loop 375.

History
Loop 375 was designated on January 26, 1962, from I-10 southeastward, eastward, southeastward, and southward to the Zaragosa International Bridge. On January 1, 1965, the section of FM 259 from I-10 to US 80 (now SH 20) became part of Loop 375. On April 1, 1968, Loop 375 was extended northwestward 12.5 miles, and the section to the Zaragosa International Bridge became a spur connection. On January 29, 1991, the section from SH 20 northeast to Loop 375 was also added, which when constructed, the old route of Loop 375 was to be deleted. On April 24, 2008, this section was deleted, but was restored as Spur 276 on July 31, 2008, but this was changed to Spur 16 on July 26, 2012, probably due to a reference to the old Loop 16.

Future 
The Texas Department of Transportation announced plans to add toll lanes to the Border Highway portion of Loop 375 between Downtown El Paso and the Ysleta–Zaragoza International Bridge.

In 2012, construction commenced on an upgrade of the Transmountain Drive section of Loop 375. This expansion was controversial, as this section passes through the protected Franklin Mountains State Park.

Exit list

See also

 List of state highway loops in Texas

References

External links

 Loop 375 Border Highway

Transportation in El Paso County, Texas
375
Transportation in El Paso, Texas